Omar Dave Smith (born September 8, 1977) is a former American football center who played in the National Football League for three seasons. He played college football at Kentucky.

Professional career

St. Louis Rams
After going undrafted in the 2001 NFL Draft, Smith signed with the St. Louis Rams as a free agent. Smith was released before the start of the season.

Oakland Raiders
Smith spent one week on the Oakland Raiders practice squad during the 2001 season.

New York Giants
After the 2001 season, Smith was signed by the New York Giants. He saw action in 11 games over two seasons. Smith failed to make the team out of training camp in 2004, and was released.

Tampa Bay Storm
On November 9, 2004, Smith was signed by the Tampa Bay Storm of the Arena Football League. In the 2005 season, he played in 16 games for the Storm, making three tackles.

References

External links
 Football Database bio
 ArenaFan bio

1977 births
Living people
Players of American football from Florida
American football centers
Kentucky Wildcats football players
St. Louis Rams players
Oakland Raiders players
New York Giants players
Nova High School alumni
People from Davie, Florida
People from Spanish Town
Jamaican players of American football
Sportspeople from Broward County, Florida